The D.I.C.E. Award for Outstanding Achievement in Audio Design is an award presented annually by the Academy of Interactive Arts & Sciences during the academy's annual D.I.C.E. Awards. This award is "presented to the individual or team whose work represents the highest level of achievement in creating a unified audio experience. The quality of the individual sound effects, voice over, music, technology, and other audio elements will be considered in addition to the overall audio mix of the title."

The award's most recent winner is God of War Ragnarök, developed by Santa Monica Studio and published by Sony Interactive Entertainment.

History
The award was initially presented as the Outstanding Achievement in Sound and Music Design for "creating a unified audio environment, integrating both music and audio effects, in an interactive title". The first winner was PaRappa the Rapper, which was developed NanaOn-Sha and published by Sony Computer Entertainment. It was simplified into Outstanding Achievement in Sound Design at the 3rd Annual Interactive Achievement Awards. The award would be renamed to its current title at the 23rd Annual D.I.C.E. Awards.

Winners and nominees

1990s

2000s

2010s

2020s

Multiple nominations and wins

Developers and publishers 
Sony has published the most nominees, and is tied with Electronic Arts for publishing the most winners. Both publishers have had winning streaks for the award. Sony has the longest winning streak having won the award for the past 4 years. Sony also has the record of having published the most nominees in a single year, at the 24th Annual D.I.C.E. Awards. Electronic Arts developer DICE and Ubisoft Montreal have developed the most nominees and DICE and Sony's Santa Monic Studio have developed the most winners for the award. DICE and DreamWorks Interactive are the only developers with back-to-back wins for the award. Ubisoft currently has published the most nominees without having published a single winner. Ubisoft Montreal has developed the most nominees without developing a single winner. Ubisoft Montreal is also one of the few studios that have developed more than one nominee for a single year. The other studios are Interplay Productions, Monolith Productions, and EA Black Box.

Franchises 
The most nominated franchise has been Call of Duty and God of War has been the most award-winning franchise. Battlefield and Medal of Honor are the only other franchises so far to have won more than once. The Tom Clancy franchise has the most nominations without winning a single award and is the only franchise with more than one nominee in one year.

Notes

References 

D.I.C.E. Awards
Awards established in 1998
Awards for best video game